Molesworth is a surname, and may refer to:

Caroline Molesworth (1794-1872), British botanist and meteorologist
Carlton Molesworth (1876-1961), baseball player
George Molesworth (1890–1968), English army officer
Guilford Lindsey Molesworth (1828-1925), English civil engineer
Hender Molesworth, 1st Baronet (1638–1639), Governor of Jamaica
James Thomas Molesworth (1795–1871), English military officer and lexicographer, nephew of 6th Viscount Molesworth
Keith Molesworth (1905-1966), American football player
Mary Louisa Molesworth (1839–1921), English children’s writer
Maud Margaret 'Mall' Molesworth (1894–1985) (née Mutch), Australian tennis player
Nigel Molesworth, schoolboy protagonist of the Molesworth series of books written by Geoffrey Willans, with cartoons by Ronald Searle
Percy B. Molesworth (1867–1908), British military officer and amateur astronomer
Richard Molesworth, 3rd Viscount Molesworth, PC (1680–1758), British military officer 
Robert Molesworth (disambiguation), several people
Thomas C. Molesworth (1890-1977), American furniture designer
Voltaire Molesworth (1890–1934), Australian politician
William Molesworth (disambiguation), several people

See also
Molesworth (disambiguation) 
Viscount Molesworth, Irish title
Molesworth-St Aubyn baronets, British title
Molesworth of Tetcott, an English family, of Tetcott, Devon